CRRC Corporation Limited (known as CRRC) is a Chinese state-owned and publicly traded rolling stock manufacturer. It is the world's largest rolling stock manufacturer in terms of revenue, eclipsing its major competitors of Alstom and Siemens.

It was formed on 1 June 2015 through the merger of CNR and CSR. As of 2016 it had 183,061 employees. The parent company is CRRC Group, a state-owned enterprise supervised by the State-owned Assets Supervision and Administration Commission of the State Council. The State Council also owned additional shares via China Securities Finance and Central Huijin Investment.

History

Merger
CNR Group and CSR Group, were once one company,  (LORIC). The company was split up in 2002.

In late 2014, CNR Group and CSR Group agreed to merge, subject to approval by the Chinese state. Under the agreement, CNR Group would formally acquire CSR Group (but CSR Corporation Limited would acquire China CNR Corporation Limited), and the combined business would be renamed CRRC Group and CRRC Corporation Limited respectively. The rationales given for the merger were increased efficiency, and the ability to better compete internationally.

The merger came into effect 1 June 2015, with each CNR share exchanged for 1.1 CSR shares - the combined company became the largest railway rolling stock manufacturer in the world, and held over 90% of the Chinese market.

Overseas expansion
After the re-merger, CRRC started expanding overseas; after being awarded a 284 vehicle order (later expanded to 404 vehicles) for metro cars for Massachusetts Bay Transportation Authority's Red and Orange lines with a US$556.6 million bid in October 2014, the company started constructing a  assembly plant in Springfield, Massachusetts, at a former Westinghouse plant beginning in September 2015. Manufacturing work began in April 2018.

In mid-2015, production began at a rolling stock plant in Batu Gajah, Perak, Malaysia, a satellite of CRRC Zhuzhou Locomotive, and the corporation's first plant outside China. Additionally the former CSR had acquired Emprendimientos Ferroviarios in Argentina in 2014 and announced in 2016 that it would begin maintenance and production of new rolling stock for export in the country. Argentina had previously purchased a variety of rolling stock from the company over the years, including 704 EMU cars, 81 DMU cars, 44 passenger locomotives, 360 carriages, 107 freight locomotives and 3,500 freight cars, in addition to the 150 200 Series cars for the Subte. In 2017, the Argentine government purchased an additional 200 EMUs from CRRC.

In mid-2015, CRRC formed a freight wagon joint venture, Vertex Railcar, as a minority partner with Hong Kong-based private equity firm Majestic Legend Holdings to establish production in Wilmington, North Carolina at a former Terex facility. CRRC provided railcar designs and some components, and Majestic Legend invested US$6 million; the plant was operational by the beginning of 2016. In August 2016, at the request of a letter from 55 US House of Representatives members alleging that Vertex was being unfairly subsidized by the Chinese government, the United States Department of the Treasury began an investigation into whether the Chinese investment in Vertex constituted a national security risk. 42 US Senators sent a similar letter in September, conveying concerns about the state-owned enterprises behind Vertex. The Treasury Department released its report in December and found that the joint ownership was not a risk.

In late 2015, Yu Weiping, one of the vice-president of the company, stated the company planned to double overseas sales over five years, with North American passenger rail being one target. Interim six month financial results for the new company showed an increase in overseas revenue of over 60%.

In March 2016, CRRC Qingdao Sifang was awarded a contract to build 400 7000-series cars for the Chicago Transit Authority (CTA), with an option for another 446 cars. The cost of the contract was US$632 million up to US$1.3 billion with options; as a consequence CRRC began development of a US$40 million assembly factory in Chicago, designed by Itasca, IL-based Cornerstone Architects Ltd.

In March 2017, Quincy, Massachusetts based CRRC MA was awarded a contract by SEPTA to construct 45 bi-level rail cars with the option for 10 additional cars for delivery in October 2019. The SEPTA order will be built at the Springfield plant and car shell manufactured from the Tangshan plant. CRRC was selected over Hyundai Rotem and Bombardier, which also bid on the bi-level contract and had each produced equipment for SEPTA in the past. Later that month, CRRC was also awarded a contract to build 64 HR4000 cars for the Los Angeles County Metropolitan Transportation Authority (LACMTA) that will replace existing vehicles on the agency's Red and Purple lines, with an option for another 218 cars. The LACMTA order will result in a  assembly plant (installing propulsion, HVAC and other general assembly) being built in LA.

Delivery of the MBTA Red and Orange Line cars was severely delayed, and problems with electrical shorts, loose brake bolts, and derailments led to several removals of the new trains from service. The company blamed supply chain issues caused by the COVID-19 pandemic, but an MBTA official told CRRC MA management it "has completely abandoned its core responsibilities and commitment to lead, monitor and support quality management", and cited 16 specific failure areas.
Workers at the site reported problems with quality tracking, trains being advanced through the assembly process despite missing parts, assembly occurring in the wrong order, and being left with nothing to do for months at a time because a disorderly invoice system failed to reliably pay suppliers for parts.

South African bribery allegations 
In June 2016 a predecessor company of CRRC, CSR Corporation Limited, was implicated in allegations of bribery to obtain a 2012 US$6 billion tender to deliver 600 locomotives to the state owned Passenger Rail Agency of South Africa (PRASA).  It was reported that the future South African Public Protector Busisiwe Mkhwebane was implicated in the deal when she worked as Counselor Immigration and Civic Services in South Africa's embassy in China. By 2020 it was reported that funds allocated to pay for an adjusted contract to deliver the locomotives produced by CSR Corporation, now reformed into CRRC, had been frozen by the South African Revenue Service due to possible instances of corruption paid to associates of the Gupta family.

U.S. sanctions 

The United States Department of Defense alleges CRRC is a supplier to People's Liberation Army. In November 2020, Donald Trump issued an executive order prohibiting any American company or individual from owning shares in companies that the United States Department of Defense has listed as having links to the People's Liberation Army, which included CRRC.

In October 2022, the United States Department of Defense added CRRC to a list of "Chinese military companies" operating in the U.S.

Shareholders
, CRRC was majority owned by CRRC Group directly and indirectly (via CRRC Financial and Securities Investment,  for 1.64%) for 55.91% of total share capital (all in A share). Other state-owned entities of the central government, such as China Securities Finance (2.87%) and Central Huijin Investment (1.12%), also owned a minority stake. In terms of different shares, BlackRock owned 6.13% H shares in long position (267,971,072 number of shares), or 0.98% in terms of total share capital. Himalaya Capital Investors, a Seattle based mutual fund also owned about 6.13% H shares in long position (267,904,000 number of shares). Other shareholders each owned less than 1% shares in terms of total share capital.

Subsidiaries

Locomotive 
 CRRC Beijing Locomotive
 CRRC Datong Electric Locomotive
 CRRC Qishuyan Locomotive
 CRRC Luoyang Locomotive
 CRRC Xiangfan Locomotive
 CRRC Zhuzhou [Electric] Locomotive
 CRRC Ziyang Locomotive

Rolling Stock
 CRRC February 7 Rolling Stock
 CRRC Qiqihar Railway Rolling Stock
 CRRC Harbin Rolling Stock
 
 CRRC Meishan Rolling Stock
 CRRC Nanjing Puzhen Rolling Stock
 CRRC Shijiazhuang Rolling Stock
 CRRC Taiyuan Railway Rolling Stock
 CRRC Yangtze Rolling Stock
 CRRC Xi'an Railway Rolling Stock

Locomotive & Rolling Stock
 CRRC Chengdu
 CRRC Dalian
 CRRC Qingdao Sifang
 CRRC Tangshan

Other
 CRRC Beijing Nankou Railway Transportation Machinery
 CRRC Changchun Railway Vehicles
 CRRC Dalian Locomotive Research Institute
 CRRC Jinan Railway Vehicles Equipment
 CRRC Qingdao Sifang Rolling Stock Research Institute
 CRRC Lanzhou Locomotive
 CRRC Shijiazhuang Guoxiang Transportation Equipment
 CRRC Tangshan Railway Transportation Equipment
 CRRC Tianjin Railway Transport Equipment
 CRRC Yongji Xinshisu Electric Equipment
 CRRC Zhuzhou Electric
 CRRC Zhuzhou Institute (former Zhuzhou Electric Locomotive Research Institute) (100%)
 Zhuzhou CRRC Times Electric (51.81%)

Joint venture
 Bombardier Sifang Transportation

Overseas
 CRRC Massachusetts
 CRRC Sifang America
 Dynex Semiconductor (United Kingdom)
 Emprendimientos Ferroviarios (Argentina)
 CRRC Kuala Lumpur Maintenance Sdn. Bhd. (Malaysia) 
 Vossloh Locomotives (Germany)

Other investments
It also joint-owned Zhuzhou Times New Material Technology with parent company CRRC Group.

In November 2016 the company (via CRRC Zhuzhou Locomotive) confirmed plans to buy Škoda Transportation based in the Czech Republic. The deal eventually did not go through.

See also
 High-speed rail in China

Notes

References

External links

 

Chinese brands
Chinese companies established in 2015
Companies listed on the Shanghai Stock Exchange
Companies listed on the Hong Kong Stock Exchange
Companies in the CSI 100 Index
Vehicle manufacturing companies established in 2015
 2
Government-owned companies of China
Defence companies of the People's Republic of China